Pelin Aroğuz (born May 8, 1997) is a Turkish female volleyball player. Aroğuz is member of the Turkey girls' youth national volleyball team, and wears number 9. In 2014, she was called up to the Turkey women's junior national volleyball team.

She played in the girls' youth team of her primary school Bilfen Ataşehir İlköğretim, which won the district league at Ataşehir, Istanbul in the 2011-12 season.

In the 2012-13 season, she played in Vakıfbank's youth team, which won the Turkish PAV League (league for teams of candidate professional volleyball players) undefeated.

In January 2012, Aroğuz was admitted to the Turkey girls' youth national team. She debuted internationally at the International Brussels Tournament in February 2013, at which she claimed her first national gold medal, and was named "Most Valuable Player" of the tournament in Belgium.

Pelin Aroğuz won the bronze medal with national team at the 2013 Girls' Youth European Volleyball Championship held in Serbia and Montenegro from March 30 to April 7, 2013. She was selected "Best Spiker" of the championship.

With the women's junior national team, she won the bronze medal at the 2014 Women's Junior European Volleyball Championship held in Finland and Estonia. She was selected "Best Spiker" of the championship.

Awards

Individual
 2013 International Brussels Tournament - Most Valuable Player
 2013 Girls' Youth European Volleyball Championship - Best Spiker
 2014 Women's Junior European Volleyball Championship - Best Spiker

National team
2013 International Brussels Tournament - 
2013 Girls' Youth European Volleyball Championship - 
2014 Women's Junior European Volleyball Championship -

Club
2012-13 Turkish PAV League  with Vakıfbank Girls' Youth team

See also
 Turkish women in sports

References

1997 births
Living people
Turkish women's volleyball players
VakıfBank S.K. volleyballers
Place of birth missing (living people)